Kern County Raceway Park is a  oval speedway located on CA 43 (Enos Lane) just off Interstate 5 in Bakersfield, Kern County, California, United States. Opened in 2013, it was built as a replacement for Mesa Marin Raceway.

Kern County Raceway Park hosts events with NASCAR's Whelen All-American Series along with a K&N Pro Series West race since 2013.

The track has banks of 8° in the straightaways, with 14° paved corners. The track has 5,000 seats for fans, and room to expand to 17,000 seats for various events. It also contains 21 suites in the grandstand along with 18 concession stands.

The property also contains a  asymmetrical clay oval track, just north of the paved oval.  Turns 1-2 are tighter than turns 3-4.  The first event for this track was September 4, 2015. The clay oval track hosts rounds of the NARC King of the West Sprints and the USAC West Coast Sprints and Midgets. Northwest of the track is also a motocross motorcycle track.

History
The Collins family joined the DeStefani family in planning the new half-mile D-oval that replaced Mesa Marin Raceway. The track, located at the crossroads of Interstate 5 and State Route 43 (Enos Lane) along the Kern River, broke ground in February 2007.

The track features a progressively banked track, similar to its neighbor in the south, Irwindale Speedway, starting at 12 degrees on the bottom and rising to 14 degrees at the top. Turns 1-2 have an uphill climb to the backstretch, ten feet higher than the pit straight, for spectator visibility.  Turns 3-4 feature a ten-foot descent.  A 1/8-mile dragstrip and a 1/4-mile infield oval are slated.

The track, completed in March 2013, had its first NASCAR–sanctioned race on October 26, 2013, with the K&N Pro Series West. The track held a Fan Appreciation Day on May 4, 2013 and announced the first race to be held at Kern County Raceway Park would be a 100-lap Whelen All-American Series race on the main track. Bandoleros also competed that day on the  track within the main course. Mini dwarf cars also ran on May 18, competing on the  track.

Kern County Raceway Divisions
Kern County Raceway features local racing in 8 different divisions. These divisions include Pro Late Models, CITGO Late Model, Spec-Mods, Street Stock, Mini Stock, Legends car racing, Bandolero racing and Mini-Dwarfs. During the 2013 season, Kern County Raceway also hosted a drifting exhibition, Super Trucks and Thunder Roadsters.

2013 season
The 2013 Season at Kern County Raceway included the return of the SRL Southwest Tour to Kern County for the first time in 8 years. On October 26, 2013, Kern County Raceway also hosted the K&N Pro Series West race named the "NAPA Auto Parts 150."

2014 season

In addition to racing, Kern County Raceway also hosted its First Annual Car Show on March 22, 2014. The track also hosted the SRL Southwest Tour for 2 races including the DC's RV Center 100 on April 5 and for the CITGO Lubricants Fall Shootout on November 1. The K&N Pro Series West also made two stops with the second one being nationally televised by Fox Sports 1. In addition, it will host the first pavement sprint car national championship as the King Of The Wing series will be at the track on November 23.

Track Champions

References

External links 

Kern County Raceway Park

NASCAR tracks
Motorsport venues in California
History of Bakersfield, California
Sports in Bakersfield, California